This list comprises all players who have participated in at least one league match for San Antonio Scorpions FC in the North American Soccer League from 2012 to present. Players who were on the roster but never played a first team game are not listed; players who appeared for the team in other competitions (Lamar Hunt U.S. Open Cup, CONCACAF Champions League, etc.) but never actually made an NASL appearance are noted at the bottom of the page where appropriate.

A "†" denotes players who only appeared in a single match.

B
  Esteban Bayona

C
  Pablo Campos
  Ryan Cochrane
  Jeff Cunningham

D
  Hans Denissen
  Tyler Deric †

G
  Matt Gold
  Jonathan Greenfield

H
  Patrick Hannigan
  Kevin Harmse
  Craig Hill

J
  Greg Janicki

K
  Fabian Kling
  Wes Knight

N
  Amaury Nunes †

P
  Aaron Pitchkolan
  Euan Purcell

R
  Walter Ramírez

S
  Javier Saavedra
  Daryl Sattler
  Josue Soto

T
  Luiz Tiago

W
  Blake Wagner

Sources

San Antonio Scorpions
 
Association football player non-biographical articles